Wish is the debut album by actress and singer Sutton Foster, released through Ghostlight Records on February 17, 2009.

Track listing
"I'm Beginning to See the Light" by Duke Ellington, Don George, Johnny Hodges, and Harry James
"Warm All Over"
"The Late, Late Show"
"Up on the Roof" by Carole King and Gerry Goffin
"My Romance/Danglin" from Jumbo
"I Like the Sunrise"
"Air Conditioner"
"Sunshine on My Shoulders" by John Denver
"My Heart Was Set on You"
"Flight"
"Once Upon a Time"
"Nobody's Cryin"
"Come the Wild, Wild Weather"
"On My Way" from Violet
"Oklahoma" from Oklahoma!

Reception

Dick Scanlan described the album by saying "If the song list is eclectic, so is the singer. You know that magical quality of morning light after a night of torrential downpour? Redemptive. Pure. Joyful, but a joy hard-won by having survived the rain."

Promotion
Broadway.com released two behind-the-scenes videos of the making of the album, and although Foster was unable to tour due to prior commitment to her role in Shrek on Broadway, she did hold a concert at the Rose Theater to help promote the album.

References

External links

2009 debut albums